Teen Dance Ordinance is the fourth album by the alternative rock group A. It was released on 25 June 2005 in the United Kingdom and later in the United States. The title refers to a law passed in 1985 by Seattle City Council and repealed in 2002 which prohibited minors and adults from attending the same dance clubs. It featured a more straight-rock sound and displayed an almost complete absence of the keyboards and sampling that marked the early sound of the band.

Due to many delays in the release of the album, which consisted of the label shelving the album for two years after recording was already completed in 2003 and Jason Perry experiencing illness, the band already were out of general public interest due to the long time they were away from releasing material. This meant the album was given very little promotional attention by the label and media, meaning it only charted at #95 in the UK charts and the band was dropped by Warner in October as a result.  After the failure of the album, the band broke up until reforming in 2008. To date, this is the band's final album.

"Rush Song" was played as background music in the UK version of the television show Pimp My Ride.

Track listing
 "Rush Song" – 4:09
 "Better Off with Him" – 3:30
 "The Art of Making Sense" – 4:13
 "Someone Else" – 3:55
 "Die Tonight" – 4:02
 "2nd Coming" – 4:13
 "Wake Up" – 2:43
 "Black Hole" – 4:15
 "Hey" – 4:06
 "Worst Thing That Can Happen" – 3:36
 "Afterburner" – 4:19
 "Wisdom" – 4:24

Singles 

Rush Song

CD1:

 "Rush Song" – 4:11
 "French Kiss" – 3:14

CD2:

 "Rush Song" – 4:11
 "Get Out More" – 4:17
 "Have The Night" – 3:43
 "Rush Song" (Video)

Better Off With Him

CD:

 "Better Off With Him" – 3:36
 "Descender" – 3:10

DVD

DVD contains Better Off With Him Audio and Video. Making of the Video, a Making of the album video and an audio track "Broken Island"

References

External links
Seattle Post-Intelligencer article on repeal of the TDO

A (band) albums
2005 albums
Albums produced by Terry Date